Teelah is a rural locality in the South Burnett Region, Queensland, Australia. In the  Teelah had a population of 68 people.

Geography 
Teelah has the following mountains:

There is a small area of rural residential properties in the south-west of the locality, but otherwise the land use is grazing on native vegetation.

History 
In the  Teelah had a population of 68 people.

On 1 February 2018, Teelah's postcode changed from 4306 to 4314.

References 

South Burnett Region
Localities in Queensland